SSRM may stand for:

 Scanning spreading resistance microscopy, a scanning probe microscopy technique that involves the use of an atomic force microscope
 Shared security responsibility model (or "Shared responsibility model"), a loose framework for delineating client and provider responsibility for security in the cloud
 Soviet Socialist Republic of Moldova, a former name of the Moldavian Soviet Socialist Republic
 Strategic supplier relationship management, a form of supplier relationship management with extra emphasis on collaborative approaches to create additional value in the partnership